Riley Griffiths (born May 14, 1997) is an American football player and former actor, best known for his role as Charles Kaznyk in the 2011 film, Super 8.

Early life and education
Griffiths was born on May 14, 1997 in Cedar City, Utah. His first acting role came when he was 6 years old, when he participated in a version of William Shakespeare's A Midsummer Night's Dream.

Griffiths' family later moved to the Issaquah/Sammamish area. While attending Skyline High School, Griffiths played as a defensive lineman for the varsity football team. He also played defensive line while attending Montana  State University.

Career
In 2010, Griffiths got his first major role, when he was selected to play the role of Charles Kaznyk, in Super 8, directed by J. J. Abrams and produced by Steven Spielberg. While attending Montana State University, Griffiths was a defensive linemen for the Bobcats’ football team. He has expressed interest in working behind the scenes on film.

Filmography

Film

Television

Awards and nominations

References

External links

1997 births
American male child actors
American male film actors
American people of Welsh descent
Living people
Male actors from Utah